Replayable CCA security (RCCA security) is a security notion in cryptography that relaxes the older notion of Security against Chosen-Ciphertext Attack (CCA, more precisely adaptive security notion CCA2): all CCA-secure systems are RCCA secure but the converse is not true. The claim is that for a lot of use cases, CCA is too strong and RCCA suffices. Nowadays a certain amount of cryptographic scheme are proved RCCA-secure instead of CCA secure. It was introduced in 2003 in a research publication by Ran Canetti, Hugo Krawczyk and Jesper B. Nielsen.

References

Cryptography